Vinukonda railway station (station code:VKN), is an Indian Railways station in Vinukonda of Andhra Pradesh. It lies on the Nallapadu–Nandyal section and is administered under Guntur railway division of South Central Railway zone. It is one of the stations in the division to be equipped with Automatic Ticket Vending Machines (ATVM's).

See also 
 List of railway stations in India

References 

Railway stations in Guntur district
Railway stations in Guntur railway division